Sharya is the name of several inhabited localities in Russia.

Urban localities
Sharya, a town in Kostroma Oblast; 
Sharya (Iraq), a town located in northern Iraq
Rural localities
Sharya, Chudovsky District, Novgorod Oblast, a village in Gruzinskoye Settlement of Chudovsky District in Novgorod Oblast
Sharya, Lyubytinsky District, Novgorod Oblast, a village under the administrative jurisdiction of Nebolchskoye Settlement in Lyubytinsky District of Novgorod Oblast